Events in the year 1662 in Norway.

Incumbents
Monarch: Frederick III

Events

February 19 - A royal decree introduces the subdivision Amt as a replacement for the len subdivision.
Vardø witch trials: 
2 September - The trials begin.
6 November - Dorte Laurtitsdatter, Maren Sigvaldsdatter and Marit Rasmusdatter from Vadsø, and Ragnhild Klemetsdatter, Maren Mogensdatter and Marit Hemingsdatter from Ekkerøy, were all burned to death for witchcraft.
Fredriksholm Fortress is established.

Arts and literature

Births

 Karen Toller, estate owner and ship owner (died 1742).

Deaths

See also

References